Bjelovar (Kajkavian: Belovar) is a city in central Croatia. It is the administrative centre of Bjelovar-Bilogora County. At the 2021 census, there were 36,433 inhabitants, of whom 93.06% were Croats.

History
The oldest Neolithic location in this area is in Ždralovi, a suburb of Bjelovar, where, while building a basement for the house of Josip Horvatić, a dugout was found and identified as belonging to the Starčevo culture (5000 – 4300 BC). Finds from Ždralovi belong to a regional subtype of a late variant of the Neolithic culture. It is designated the Ždralovi facies of the Starčevo culture, or the final-stage Starčevo. There are also relics of the Korenovo culture, Sopot culture, Lasinja culture, and the Vučedol culture.  as well as the Bronze and Iron Age cultures, found in the wider Bjelovar area. The more intensive development of the area began with the arrival of the Romans, who first came to the area between the Sava and Drava rivers in 229 BC. The intersection of two Roman roads was located exactly at the place where the present-day Bjelovar developed, and in its immediate vicinity was a military camp or station. 

With the stabilization of the northern border of the Roman Empire, a collection of settlements probably developed here in the period from II. to IV. century, unrecorded on Roman itineraries, but attested by archaeological remains on today's Matošev Square, Stjepan Radić Square and findings in the wider city area, such as the most prominent findings in the forest and area of Lug.

Bjelovar in its modern form however is one of the youngest cities in Croatia. Bjelovar was first mentioned in 1413.  With the penetration of the Turks in the 16th century, only those fortified settlements under the special authority of the Viennese court, where the local population took shelter and survived. Only with the establishment of an administrative and military system of defense against the Turks, better known as the Croatian Military Frontier within which the Bjelovar area was located, Bjelovar (then "Bellowar") was repeatedly mentioned on military maps since the first half of the 17th century. It is mentioned as a military guardhouse, which indicates that it was already included in the Frontier defense system then. Stabilization of the Habsburg-Ottoman border on the Sava river and the new circumstances in the society of the region in the first half of the 18th century conditioned the territorial and administrative reorganization of the Varaždin Generalate.

The Severin Uprising (also known as the Varaždin rebellion), which took place in 1755 in the immediate vicinity of the future city, pointed to the need for a new center from which better control of the Krajišan could be carried out. Viennese military strategists decided to establish a new settlement that would take over the function of headquarters of regimental administrations. A location was chosen in the center of the generalate, on the dividing line between the Križevačka and Đurđevačka regiments. 

The foundation and beginning of the construction of Bjelovar dates back to 1756, when the land was purchased and a permit was issued for the purchase of building materials, and the construction was led by Baron Philipp Lewin von Beck. From the very beginning, the city was conceived as the center of the regiments of the Varaždin Generalate, and in accordance with the military function, the construction of military facilities and the settlement of the military population first began. As well as the resettlement of many Czech and Croatian peasants as workforce on the new fort. The exception is the block on the square where the parish church of St. Teresa of Avila (now the Cathedral of St. Teresa of Avila) and the Piarist monastery and school. Two Piarist monks, brothers Hubert and Ignac Diviš, came to Bjelovar in 1761 and opened the first public school on the Đurđevac side of town. By the decision of Maria Theresa on the construction of a new church, which was completed in 1772, the parish of Bjelovar was established, which until 1790 managed by Piarists. In 1771, Empress Maria Theresa confirmed Bjelovar's status as a privileged Krajina city, i.e. a military community, which resulted in demographic and significant economic growth. This trend continued at the beginning of the 19th century when the city began to expand beyond its original borders. And with time it became the administrative centre of the Bjelovar-Križevci county.

The then town of Bjelovar was pronounced a free royal town by ban Ivan Mažuranić in 1874. after the Ottoman wars ended. Peaceful life and economic boom was interrupted by the beginning of the First World War. As an important military town, Bjelovar made its contribution by recruiting the male population, converting many public buildings into hospitals, using the railway to transport soldiers and the wounded. Consequently with the war dragging on, the shortage of manpower and natural resources led to a difficult economic situation and a general shortage of food. With the end of the war Bjelovar became part of the Kingdom of Serbs, Croats and Slovenes and it retained its status as the administrative centre of the Bjelovar-Križevci county. The Vidovdan Constitution of 1921, and on the basis of the Law on Regional and County Self-Government (1922), the Kingdom of SHS was divided into 33 oblasts, and Bjelovar thereby lost the status of county center and became part of the Osijek oblast with the status of a district and a city.

Thanks to the economic foundations created in the previous period, based on trade, crafts and industry, the positive economic trend continued until The Great Depression, when the growth of registered merchants, craftsmen and industrialists was still recorded, but with much lower incomes. In the interwar period, the city received some new facilities. The football field of the Bjelovar Academic Sports Club was arranged in the modern-day city quarter of Logorište.  Public city pools also were established.

The short-lived period of the Independent State of Croatia during the Second World War stopped the development of the city in all areas. Two days before the official proclamation in Zagreb, on April 8, 1941, from the balcony of the then city hall (now the building of the Bjelovar City Museum), the mayor Dr. Julije Makanec proclaimed the Independent State of Croatia during the event known as the Bjelovar Uprising. Within two months, a new territorial-administrative division of the state into 22 parishes followed. Thus, after 17 years, the town of Bjelovar again became the regional center, now of the newly founded Greater Bilogora parish. During the war, unlike the villages in the immediate vicinity of Bjelovar, the town did not experience severe material destruction. On several occasions, only the railway was bombed as well as the military bases in the quarter of Vojnović.

With the end of the war and the arrival of the new socialist government, tendencies towards the modernization of the state and the restoration of the failing industry and communal infrastructure were evident from the very beginning. Housing construction was intensified mainly in the northern part of the city such as the quarters of Sjever, Zvijerci, Logorište, Ivanovčani and Pemsko Polje as well as to the south in the quarter of Jug. in 1960 a new post office building was built on the site of the old post office building. In 1955, the Koestlin plant moved from the city core to the industrial zone south of the railway towards Kloštar. In addition to Koestlin and the already existing factories of Toma Vinković, Česma, Tehnogradnja and Elektrometal, new plants were built in this area from the 1960s, while the United Paromlin (later renamed 5 .Maj), stayed in its historical location by the old mill, where it was reorganized and constructed the 50 metre tall Bjelovar silos complex. 

1968 saw the construction of an eleven-story skyscraper at the corner of Preradovićeva and Matica Hrvatske (then the Street of Marshal Tito) streets. Due to the expansion of the city and the increase in population, a new Primary School "Maršal Tito" and a School-Sports Hall (now known as the IV. elementary school) was built in Logorište.The expansion of the Medical Center was also started. From 1976 to 1982, a new building and residential complex of 12,000 square meters was built in Franjevacka Street  known as Winterovo naselje, after the old name of Franjevacka street (Winterovo street).  In addition to demographic and economic growth, the aforementioned built infrastructure contributed to the strengthening of all functions, which turned Bjelovar into one of the most important centers of northwestern Croatia.

After the first multi-party democratic elections in the SR Croatia held on April 22 and 23, 1990, the newly founded Croatian Democratic Union won power in Bjelovar as well. After the referendum and the declaration of independence, the crisis worsened and conflicts began. For this reason, on September 12, the President of the Republic of Croatia, Dr. Franjo Tuđman, made a decision to block all JNA barracks in Croatia and suspend the supply of electricity, water and food to these barracks. After a series of unsuccessful attempts to get the JNA army to peacefully leave the barracks located in the city or in its immediate surroundings, namely the barracks or military facilities in the quarters of Logorište, Vojnović, Zvijerci, the forest of Bedenik (The Barutana depot) and the Preradović barracks on the main city square, known as the Božidar Adžija Barracks.

On the morning of 29 September, the ZNG (Zbor narodne garde) and Croatian police attacked the JNA facilities in Bjelovar. In response, Kovačević contacted the JNA 5th Military District in Zagreb and requested airstrikes against the city and the ZNG. The sources do not indicate if the requested airstrikes were carried out. The 5th Military District instead pressured the central Croatian authorities to order the ZNG in Bjelovar to observe a comprehensive ceasefire previously agreed between Croatia and the JNA on 22 September. In order to verify the ceasefire, the European Community Monitor Mission (ECMM) deployed a monitoring team to the city. However, the authorities in Bjelovar ignored the order they received from the General Staff and stopped the ECMM team before it reached the city. According to Šimić, the move was made after Lieutenant General Petar Stipetić telephoned him and urged him to continue the attack. The authenticity of Šimić's account of has been disputed by Admiral Davor Domazet-Lošo, who claims it was an attempt to discredit Croatia before the ECMM. At 19:00, the ZNG captured Božidar Adžija Barracks. By that time, all other JNA facilities in and near Bjelovar had been captured.

Before Barutana Depot was captured by the ZNG, one of the four storage structures, containing 1,700 tonnes (1,700 long tons; 1,900 short tons) of ammunition and explosives, was blown up by JNA Major Milan Tepić. The explosion occurred at 10:43, killing Tepić, and eleven ZNG troops who were blockading the depot in Bedenik Forest. The blast knocked down trees in a circle 200 metres (660 feet) wide, caused damage to nearby structures, prodomenantly in the then suburb of Hrgovljani and could be heard 20 kilometres (12 miles) away. The JNA lost another soldier in the area of the depot, killed by an antitank missile while he was engaging the ZNG using an infantry fighting vehicle gun.

September 29, 1991 became one of the most important dates in the modern history of Bjelovar. In 1997, the City Councilr  declared that date the Day of the City of Bjelovar. Since 2007, September 29th has been marked as Bjelovar Veterans' Day.

In 2009. the then Bjelovar parish church was officially pronounced as the Cathedral of Teresa of Ávila. by the Pope Benedict XVI  making it the youngest cathedral in Croatia. On the same day,  the Roman Catholic Diocese of Bjelovar-Križevci, of which the Bjelovar cathedral is the centre, was created.

Demographics
Population by settlement:

 Bjelovar, population 27,024
 Breza, population 102
 Brezovac, population 1,080
 Ciglena, population 340
 Galovac, population 457
 Gornje Plavnice, population 687
 Gornji Tomaš, population 94
 Gudovac, population 1,095
 Klokočevac, population 828
 Kokinac, population 197
 Kupinovac, population 144
 Letičani, population 349
 Mala Ciglena, population 17
 Malo Korenovo, population 196
 Novi Pavljani, population 150
 Novoseljani, population 708
 Obrovnica, population 185
 Patkovac, population 257
 Prespa, population 511
 Prgomelje, population 696
 Prokljuvani, population 251
 Puričani, population 136
 Rajić, population 214
 Stančići, population 91
 Stare Plavnice, population 673
 Stari Pavljani, population 241
 Tomaš, population 241
 Trojstveni Markovac, population 1,301
 Veliko Korenovo, population 534
 Zvijerci, population 54
 Ždralovi, population 1,423

Geography

The city of Bjelovar stands on a plateau in the southern part of Bilogora (north-west Croatia), 135 metres above sea level. It is the capital of the Bjelovar-Bilogora county, and the natural, cultural and political centre of the area.

Bjelovar is at an intersection of roads in this area: the D28 intersects with the D43, and it lies on the road between Zagreb and west Slavonia, Podravina and Osijek. Bjelovar is currently being connected by dual carriageway with Zagreb.

North-east of Bjelovar there is a long, low elevation called Bilogora, with an average height of 150–200 m (highest point: Rajčevica, 309 m). The geology of the area consists of Pliocene sandy marl and sandstones with lesser layers of lignite. Older rocks do not appear on the surface in this area. In deep boreholes there are crystalline rocks.

Climate
Bjelovar has a temperate continental climate. Winters are moderately cold and summers are warm. The prevailing wind during winter is northerly, with easterlies becoming stronger in spring, when it may be quite cold, often blowing for several days consecutively. In summer the wind is southerly; it is warm and more humid.

Culture

Bjelovar contains three war memorials. The Barutana memorial area is dedicated to those who died defending the city on September 29, 1991, during the Croatian War of Independence. The Lug memorial area is dedicated to memorial to the Croatian victims of communism after the end of the second world war in 1945, and the Borik memorial area is dedicated to Partisans and victims killed during the Second World War.

Bjelovar hosts the yearly "BOK" (Bjelovarski odjeci kazališta or Bjelovar Echoes of Theatre) theatre festival. It was founded and is run by Bjelovar actor Goran Navojec, and it hosts a selection of the best plays performed in Croatia during previous year.

The building of a former synagogue in now used as a cultural center, the Bjelovar Synagogue.

Sport
In the 1970s, Bjelovar was known as the handball capital of Europe, when its local squad RK Bjelovar (under the name Partizan) dominated Croatian, Yugoslav, and European handball. The team came solely from Bjelovar and its environs.

International relations

Twin towns and sister cities
Bjelovar is twinned with:

 Imotski, Croatia
 Novalja, Croatia
 Pakrac, Croatia
 Rubiera, Italy
 Tomislavgrad, Bosnia and Herzegovina
 Visoko, Bosnia and Herzegovina

People
For a complete list of people from Bjelovar and Bjelovar-Bilogora County see List of people from Bjelovar-Bilogora County.

Đurđa Adlešič, Croatian politician
Momčilo Bajagić, Serbian rock musician
Bogdan Diklić, Serbian actor
Petar Gorša, Croatian sports shooter
Gordan Jandroković, Croatian politician 
Sonja Kovač, Croatian actress, model and singer 
Zdravko Mamić, Croatian sportsman of Bosnian origin 
Zoran Mamić, Croatian football manager 
Bojan Navojec, Croatian actor 
Goran Navojec, Croatian actor, founder of BOK Festival 
Mario Petreković, Croatian comedian and actor
Božidar Puretić, Croatian physician
Lavoslav Singer, Croatian industrialist
Hrvoje Tkalčić, geophysicist
Ognjen Vukojević, Croatian footballer
Dragutin Wolf, Croatian industrialist
Vojin Bakić, Croatian sculptor of Serbian origin
Goran Tribuson, Croatian prose and screenplay writer
Snježana Tribuson, Croatian screenwriter and film director
Rada Šešić, Croatian critic, film maker, film director and lecturer, founder of DOKUart Festival

See also
 List of people from Bjelovar-Bilogora County
 Roman Catholic Diocese of Bjelovar-Križevci
 NK Bjelovar
 RK Bjelovar

References

Notes

Bibliography

External links

 Bjelovar official site
 Virtual tour around Bjelovar

 
Cities and towns in Croatia
Populated places in Bjelovar-Bilogora County
Bjelovar-Križevci County
1413 establishments in Europe
15th-century establishments in Croatia
Starčevo–Körös–Criș culture
Neolithic sites of Europe